Hustle is a 1975 American neo-noir crime thriller film directed by Robert Aldrich and starring Burt Reynolds and Catherine Deneuve.

Plot
A group of field trip students and a teacher discover a woman's dead body at the beach. Two Los Angeles Police Department detectives, Phil Gaines and Louis Belgrave, are assigned to the homicide investigation. The case appears to be a suicide but things do not add up. The deceased, Gloria Hollinger, overdosed, yet the trail leads back to Leo Sellers, a wealthy and corrupt attorney. Gaines and Belgrave do not believe Gloria's death to be suicide based on information from Gaines' girlfriend, Nicole, a call girl. But they cannot close the case. Along the way, the detectives learn that Marty, Gloria's father and a headstrong veteran of the Korean War, did not believe the official report either and attempts to solve the case himself. He goes after Sellers and learns that Sellers was responsible for his daughter's death. Gaines and Belgrave track Marty to Sellers' mansion where they find Marty has just killed Sellers. Gaines stages it to look like self-defense, letting Marty off the hook for the crime. Gaines calls Nicole to reconcile, and they plan a trip to San Francisco. On his way to the airport, he stops in a convenience store and walks into the middle of an armed robbery. He trades fire with the assailant but is killed in the exchange. Belgrave goes to the airport terminal to inform Nicole, and without a word, she realizes that Gaines is gone.

Cast
 Burt Reynolds as Lieutenant Phil Gaines
 Catherine Deneuve as Nicole Britton
 Ben Johnson as Marty Hollinger
 Paul Winfield as Sergeant Louis Belgrave
 Eileen Brennan as Paula Hollinger
 Eddie Albert as Leo Sellers
 Ernest Borgnine as Santuro
 Colleen Brennan as Gloria Hollinger
 Catherine Bach as Peggy Summers
 Jack Carter as Herbie Dalitz
 Robert Englund as hold-up man

Production
Reynolds brought the script for Aldrich, while filming The Longest Yard (1974).

Aldrich said he would do the film if they could cast Catherine Deneuve for the female lead, even though the part had not been written for her. "I didn't think it worked that way", said Aldrich. "I think our middleclass mores just don't make it credible that a policeman have a love relationship with a prostitute. Because of some strange quirk in our backgrounds, the mass audience doesn't believe it. It's perfectly all right as long as she's not American. So Burt accepted this as a condition, and we put up our money and went to Paris, and waited on the great lady for a week, and she agreed to do the picture."

Aldrich and Reynolds formed their own company to make the film, called Roburt. The original title was City of Angels. The title was then changed to Home Free.

Aldrich commented that he did not think Reynolds was as good in the film as he was in The Longest Yard.

Reception
The film was a commercial success. Produced on a budget of $3.05 million, it opened on Christmas Day 1975 in 700 theatres and grossed $10 million in its first 10 days. It eventually returned $10,390,000 theatrical rentals in the United States and Canada. Reynolds said: "I think it was a good film", "At least it was a love story, which I hadn't done in a long time. Catherine Deneuve and I were a case of one plus one makes three so that brought about some interest." On Rotten Tomatoes, the film holds an approval rating of 63% based on eight reviews, with an average rating of 6.3/10.

Roger Ebert gave the film three stars out of four and called it "a movie about characters, primarily. It cares more about getting inside these people than it does about solving its crime. And the two leading characters, a Los Angeles police lieutenant and a French prostitute, become unexpectedly interesting because they're made into such individuals by Burt Reynolds and Catherine Deneuve." A. H. Weiler of The New York Times wrote, "If this apparent tribute to the Raymond Chandler-Dashiell Hammett detective genre is slightly manipulated for effects, and if it strains a mite too much and too long for its cynicism, it still emerges as a fairly realistic inspection of flawed men's efforts to cope with an obviously flawed urban society." Gene Siskel of the Chicago Tribune awarded a full four stars out of four and wrote that "violence takes a back seat to character development and storytelling techniques that are classical. Hustle is the kind of picture you don't want to see end. It's going to be a cult favorite."

Arthur D. Murphy of Variety wrote, "Because of some over-contrivances in plot, excess crassness and distended length, Hustle misses being the excellent contemporary Bogart–Chandler–Hawks–Warner Bros. cynical urban crime-and-corruption melodrama it so obviously emulates. However, Robert Aldrich's sharp-looking film has an outstanding cast, well directed to sustain interest through most of its 120 minutes." Kevin Thomas of the Los Angeles Times wrote, "While this is a wonderfully flexible genre, it does not accommodate comfortably a self-conscious nostalgia that quickly becomes soggily and cloyingly sentimental because it seems so out of place." Gary Arnold of The Washington Post wrote, "Shagan persists in fogging up his scripts with a dense layer of Hollywood weltschmerz that makes it impossible for the interesting or entertaining possibilities in his material to break through ... Hustle would be easier to consume if it were an unpretentious slice of low-life, but Shagan's sensibility turns it into stale baloney."

See also
 List of American films of 1975

References

Bibliography

External links
 
 
 
 

1975 films
1975 crime films
1970s American films
1970s crime thriller films
1970s English-language films
1970s mystery thriller films
1970s police procedural films
American crime thriller films
American mystery thriller films
American neo-noir films
American police detective films
Films about prostitution in the United States
Films directed by Robert Aldrich
Films scored by Frank De Vol
Films set in Los Angeles
Films shot in Burbank, California
Films shot in Los Angeles
Films shot in Pasadena, California
Paramount Pictures films